Saifuddin Choudhury (1 August 1952 – 14 September 2014), was an Indian politician who was a CPI(M) leader and MP from West Bengal state of India. In February 2001 he formed Party of Democratic Socialism (PDS).

Political career
He was elected to the Lok Sabha on a CPI(M) ticket from Katwa (Lok Sabha constituency) in 1980, 1984, 1989 and 1991. He took a progressive role in Shah Bano case in his tenure as a Member of Parliament. He later took important role during discussion on Narasima Rao government also. He fared very badly in the 2009 election from Jadavpur (Lok Sabha constituency). His membership of the party was not renewed.

References

People from Purba Bardhaman district
2014 deaths
20th-century Indian Muslims
Lok Sabha members from West Bengal
India MPs 1980–1984
India MPs 1984–1989
India MPs 1989–1991
India MPs 1991–1996
1952 births
Party of Democratic Socialism (India) politicians
University of Calcutta alumni
Communist Party of India (Marxist) politicians from West Bengal